The Russian Route M7 (also known as the Volga Highway) is a major trunk road running from Moscow through Vladimir and Nizhny Novgorod to Kazan in Tatarstan and Ufa in Bashkortostan. It generally follows the route of the historic Vladimirka road and, to a large extent, forms part of the European route E22. The section from Yelabuga to Ufa is also part of European route E017.

Major junctions

Route 

 0 km — Moscow Ring Road
 35 km — Elektrostal and Noginsk
 65 km — Malaya Dubna near Orekhovo-Zuyevo
 Vladimir Oblast
 81 km — Pokrov
 130 km — Lakinsk
 158 km — Yuryevets
 162 km — Vladimir
 225 km — a branch to Kovrov
 273 km — Vyazniki
 313 km — Gorokhovets
 Nizhny Novgorod Oblast
 397 km — crossing the Oka River in Nizhny Novgorod (over the Myza Bridge)
 430 km — Kstovo
 463 km — Rabotki
 491 km — Lyskovo
 544 km — Vorotynets
 Chuvash Republic
 634 km — crossing the Vyatka Highway in Cheboksary
 679 km — Tsivilsk
 Tatarstan
 761 km — crossing the Volga River in Zelenodolsk
 809 km — Kazan
 969 km — crossing the Vyatka River in Mamadysh
 1024 km — Yelabuga
 1044 km — crossing the Kama River in Naberezhnye Chelny
 Bashkortostan
 1134 km — Verkhneyarkeyevo
 1230 km — Kushnarenkovo
 1280 km — Ufa, M5

Gallery

References 

Roads in Russia